The West Atlantic languages (also the Atlantic languages or North Atlantic languages) of West Africa are a major subgroup of the Niger–Congo languages.

The Atlantic languages are spoken along the Atlantic coast from Senegal to Liberia, though transhumant Fula speakers have spread eastward and are found in large numbers across the Sahel, from Senegal to Nigeria, Cameroon and Sudan. Wolof of Senegal and several of the Fula languages are the most populous Atlantic languages, with several million speakers each. Other significant members include Serer and the Jola dialect cluster of Senegal. Temne, a major language of Sierra Leone, was included in the Atlantic subgroup in earlier classifications but in modern proposals, it is no longer grouped within Atlantic.

Most Atlantic languages exhibit consonant mutation  and have noun-class systems similar to those of the distantly related Bantu languages. Some languages are tonal, while others such as Wolof have pitch-accent systems. The basic word order tends to be SVO.

Classification and scope

Traditional classification
The Atlantic family was first identified by Sigismund Koelle in 1854. In the early 20th century, Carl Meinhof claimed that Fula was a Hamitic language, but August von Klingenhaben and Joseph Greenberg's work conclusively established Fula's close relationship with Wolof and Serer. W. A. A. Wilson notes that the validity of the family as a whole rests on much weaker evidence, though it is clear that the languages are part of the Niger–Congo family, based on evidence such as a shared noun-class system. However, comparative work on Niger–Congo is in its infancy. Classifications of Niger–Congo, usually based on lexicostatistics, generally propose that the various Atlantic languages are rather divergent, but less so than Mande and other languages that lack noun classes.

David Sapir (1971) proposed a classification of Atlantic into three branches, a northern group, a southern group, and the divergent Bijago language of the Bissagos Islands off the coast of Guinea-Bissau:

Northern
Sénégal languages: Fula–Serer; Wolof
Cangin languages
Bak languages (not including Bijago)
Eastern Sénégal–Portuguese Guinea languages
Tenda languages
Biafada–Pajade
Kobiana–Kasanga–Banhum
Nalu–Mbulungish–Baga Mboteni
Bijago
Southern
Sua
Mel languages (including Gola)
Limba

Sapir's classification is widely cited in handbooks on African linguistics (e.g. Bender 1989, Williamson & Blench 2000), and is also used in the Ethnologue (22nd ed., 2019).

Recent proposals
The unity of the Atlantic languages—as traditionally defined—has long been questioned, e.g. Dalby (1965), who argued for the Mel languages as a primary branch of Niger–Congo. At the current state of research, the wide concept of Atlantic (i.e. including the Southern languages) within the Niger–Congo family is no longer held up.

Segerer (2010, 2016) and Pozdniakov & Segerer (2017) propose a narrowed-down version of the Atlantic languages by excluding all languages of the southern branch, which they treat as four primary branches (viz. Sua, Limba, Gola, and the Mel languages) within the Niger–Congo family. The Bak languages are split from the northern languages as a coordinate subbranch within Atlantic (in the narrow sense). Bijago is assigned to the Bak languages.

Güldemann (2018) goes even further, and also treats Nalu and Mbulungish–Baga Mboteni ("Rio Nunez") as unclassified first-order branches of Niger–Congo.

Vossen & Dimmendaal (2020)
Revised classification of the Atlantic languages (Vossen & Dimmendaal 2020:166, from Pozdniakov & Segerer):

Atlantic
North
Wolof: Wolof, Lebu
Nyun-Buy
Nyun (Gunyaamolo, Gujaher, Gubëeher, etc.)
Buy (Kasanga, Kobiana)
Tenda-Jaad
Tenda: Basari, Tanda, Bedik, Bapen; Konyagi
Jaad: Biafada; Badiaranke
Fula-Sereer
Fula (Pular, Pulaar, Fulfulde, etc.)
Sereer
Cangin
Palor, Ndut
Noon, Laala, Saafi
Nalu
Nalu
Bage Fore
Baga Mboteni
Bak
Balant: Ganja, Kentohe, Fraase
Joola-Manjaku
Joola: Fogny, Banjal, Kasa, Kwaatay, Karon, Ejamat, Keeraak, etc.; Bayot ?
Manjaku
Bok, Cur, Bassarel
Pepel
Mankanya
Bijogo: Kamona, Kagbaaga, Kajoko

Merrill (2021)
Merrill (2021) proposes that Atlantic (or North Atlantic) is not a valid subgroup of Niger-Congo, but rather considers each of the established Atlantic "branches" to all be primary branches of Niger-Congo. Furthermore, Merrill suggests that due to the divergence of the Atlantic languages, the homeland of Niger-Congo may lie in the northwest of sub-Saharan Africa.

North Atlantic geographical area
Fula-Sereer (branch)
Fula
Sereer
Cangin
Wolof
Bainunk-Kobiana-Kasanga (branch)
Kobiana
Gujaher
Gubëeher
Guñaamolo
Biafada-Pajade (branch)
Pajade
Biafada
Tenda (branch)
Konyagi
Bassari
Bedik
Bak (branch)
Joola
Manjak
Balanta
Bijogo (branch)

Merrill (2021) also notes that Tenda and Biafada-Pajade share similarities with each other, and may possibly form a linkage.

Reconstruction
Proto-Atlantic lexical innovations reconstructed by Pozdniakov & Segerer (2017):

Wilson (2007:36) also proposed the tentative Proto-Atlantic reconstructions:

Sample Atlantic cognate sets:

Reconstructions for indivuadal West Atlantic branches can be found in Merrill (2021).

Numerals
Comparison of numerals in individual languages:

{| class="wikitable sortable"  style="font-size: 85%"
! Classification !! Language !! 1 !! 2 !! 3 !! 4 !! 5 !! 6 !! 7 !! 8 !! 9 !! 10
|-
| Senegambian, Serer || Sereer-Sine (1) || leŋ || ƭik || tadik || nahik || ƥetik || ɓetaa fo leŋ (5 + 1) || ɓetaa ƭak  (5 + 2) || ɓetaa tadak (5 + 3) || ɓetaa nahak (5 + 4) || xarɓaxaay
|-
| Senegambian, Serer || Serer-Sine (2) || leŋ || ɗik || tadik || nahik || ɓedik || ɓetuː fa leŋ (5 + 1) || ɓetuː ɗik  (5 + 2) || ɓetuː tadik (5 + 3) || ɓetuː nahik (5 + 4) || xarɓaxay
|-
| Senegambian, Fula-Wolof || Wolof || bɛn: || ɲaːr || ɲɛtː || ɲɛnt || dʒuroːm || dʒuroːm bɛn: (5 + 1) || dʒuroːm ɲaːr  (5 + 2) || dʒuroːm ɲɛtː  (5 + 3) || dʒuroːm ɲɛnt  (5 + 4) || fukː
|-
| Senegambian, Fula-Wolof || CE Niger Fulfulde || ɡɔ́ʔɔ̀ || ɗíɗi || tátì || náì || ɟóè || ɟóé ɡɔ̀l (5 + 1) || ɟóé ɗìɗi  (5 + 2) || ɟóé tátì (5 + 3) || ɟóé náì (5 + 4) || sáppò
|-
| Senegambian, Fula-Wolof || Western Niger Fulfulde || ɡoʔo || ɗiɗi || tati || naj || d͡ʒoj || d͡ʒeeɡom (5 + 1) || d͡ʒeɗɗi   (5 + 2) || d͡ʒeetati (5 + 3) || d͡ʒeenaj (5 + 4) || sappo
|-
| Senegambian, Fula-Wolof || Adamawa Fulfulde || ɡoʔo || ɗiɗi || tati || naj || d͡ʒowi || d͡ʒoweːɡo  (5 + 1) || d͡ʒoweːɗiɗi  (5 + 2) || d͡ʒoweːtati (5 + 3) || d͡ʒoweːnaj (5 + 4) || sappo
|-
| Senegambian, Fula-Wolof || Fulfulde Maasina || ɡoʔo || ɗiɗi || tati || naj || d͡ʒoj || d͡ʒeːɡom  (5 + 1) || d͡ʒeɗ:i   (5 + 2) || d͡ʒet:i    (5 + 3) || d͡ʒeːnaj (5 + 4) || sap:o
|-
| Senegambian, Fula-Wolof || Pular || ɡooto / ɡoo || ɗiɗi || tati || naj || d͡ʒowi || d͡ʒeeɡo  (5 + 1) || d͡ʒeeɗiɗi  (5 + 2) || d͡ʒeetati (5 + 3) || d͡ʒeenaj (5 + 4) || sappo
|-
| Senegambian, Fula-Wolof || Pulaar || ɡoo || ɗiɗi || tati || naj || d͡ʒoj || d͡ʒeeɡom  (5 + 1) || d͡ʒeeɗiɗi  (5 + 2) || d͡ʒeetati (5 + 3) || d͡ʒeenaj (5 + 4) || sappo
|-
| Eastern Senegal-Guinea, Banyun || Baïnounk Gubëeher || -nduk || -na:k || -lal: || -rendek || cilax (lit: hand) || cilax aŋɡa -nduk || cilax aŋɡa -na:k || cilax aŋɡa -lal: || cilax aŋɡa -rɛndɛk || ha:lax (litː feet)
|-
| Eastern Senegal-Guinea, Banyun || Gunyaamolo Banyun (1) || uŋɡonduk || hanakk || halall || harɛnɛk || hɐməkila || hɐməkila iŋɡi uŋɡonduk || hɐməkila iŋɡi hanakk || hɐməkila iŋɡi halall || hɐməkila iŋɡi harɛnɛk || haala (litː hands)
|-
| Eastern Senegal-Guinea, Banyun || Gunyaamolo Banyun (2) || -duk || -nak || -lall || -rɛnɛk || -məkila || -məkila iŋɡi -duk (5 + 1) || -məkila iŋɡi -nak (5 + 2) || -məkila iŋɡi -lall (5 + 3) || -məkila iŋɡi -rɛnɛk (5 + 4) || ha-lah (litː hands)
|-
| Eastern Senegal-Guinea, Nun || Kasanga (Cassanga) || -tɛɛna || -naandiid || -taar || -sannaʔ || jurooɡ || jurooɡ -tɛɛna    (5 + 1) || jurooɡ -naandiid (5 + 2) || ɡasansanna (cf. 'four') || jurooɡ -sannaʔ  (5 + 4) || ŋaarooɡ (litː 'fives')
|-
| Eastern Senegal-Guinea, Nun || Kobiana || -tee(na) || -naŋ || -teeh || -sannaŋ || jurooɡ || jurooɡ -tee(na) (5 + 1) || jurooɡ -tee(na) + ? (5 + 1 + x) || sannaŋ sannaŋ  (4 + 4) || sannaŋ sannaŋ + ? (4 + 4 + x) || ntaajã
|-
| Eastern Senegal-Guinea, Tenda || Badyara || painɛ / pakkã  || maae || mat͡ʃaw || manne || kobəda || kobəda ŋka-inɛ     (5 + 1) || kobəda ŋka maae  (5 + 2) || kobəda ŋka mat͡ʃaw (5 + 3) || kobəda ŋka manne  (5 + 4) || pappo
|-
| Eastern Senegal-Guinea, Tenda || Oniyan (Bassari) || imɐt || ɓəki || ɓətɐs || ɓənɐx || ɓəɲɟɔ || ɓəɲɟɔŋɡimɐt  (5 + 1) || ɓəɲɟɔŋɡəɓəki (5 + 2) || ɓəɲɟɔŋɡəɓətɐs  (5 + 3) || ɓəɲɟɔŋɡəɓənɐx (5 + 4) || ɛpəxw
|-
| Eastern Senegal-Guinea, Tenda || Biafada (1) || nəmma || bihe || biɟo || bini || ɡəbəda || mpaaɟi || mpaaɟi ŋɡa ɲi (6 + ɲi) || wase || leberebo || bapo
|-
| Eastern Senegal-Guinea, Tenda || Biafada (2) || -nnəmma || -ke || -jo || -nnihi || ɡəbəda || mpaaji || mpaaji nyi (6 + nyi) || wose || liberebo || ba-ppo
|-
| Eastern Senegal-Guinea, Tenda || Budik (Tenda) || riye, diye, iye || xi, ki || sas, tas || maxala, maxana || co(nje) || co nɡə iye (5 + 1) || co nɡə xi (5 + 2) || co nɡə sas (5 + 3) || co nɡə maxala (5 + 4) || ipox
|-
| Eastern Senegal-Guinea, Tenda || Wamey (Konyagi) || rjɐmpɔ || wɐhi || wɐrɐr || wɐr̃ɐh || mbəɗ || mbəɗ ɡə rjɐw̃  (5 + 1) || mbəɗ ɡə wɐhi (5 + 2) || mbəɗ ɡə wɐrɐr  (5 + 3) || mbəɗ ɡə wɐnɐh (5 + 4) || pəhw
|-
| Bijago || Bijago (Bijogo) || nɔɔd || n-som || ɲ-ɲɔɔkɔ || ya-aɡɛnɛk || n-deɔkɔ || (n-deɔkɔ) na nɔɔd (5 + 1) || (n-deɔkɔ) ni n-som (5 + 2) || (n-deɔkɔ) ni ɲ-ɲɔɔkɔ (5 + 3) || (n-deɔkɔ) na ya-aɡɛnɛk (5 + 4) || n-ruakɔ
|-
| Bak, Balant-Ganja || Balanta-Ganja || -woda || -sibi || -aabí || -tahla || -jíif || faaj || faajinɡooda (6 + 1) ? || taataala     (2 x 4) ? || -jíntahla    (5 + 4) ? || -jímmin
|-
| Bak, Balant-Ganja || Balanta-Kentohe || fho:dn / ho:dn || ksibm || khobm || ktahli || t͡ʃɪf (litː hand) || t͡ʃɪf kə fhdon (5 + 1) || t͡ʃɪf kə ksibm  (5 + 2) || t͡ʃɪf kə khobm (5 + 3) || t͡ʃɪf kə ktalhi   (5 + 4) || t͡ʃɪːfmɛn (litː whole hands)
|-
| Bak, Jola, Bayot || Bayot || ɛndon || tɪɡˑɡa || fɜzɪ || iβɛɪ || oɾɔ  (litː 'one hand') || oɾɔ-nenˑdon ('one hand plus one') || oɾɔ-niɾɪɡˑɡa  ('one hand plus two') || oɾɔ-nifɛzɪ   ('one hand plus three') || oɾɔ-niβɛɪ    ('one hand plus four') || ɡʊtˑtɪɛ ('two hands' )
|-
| Bak, Jola, Bayot || Senegal Bayot || ɛndon || ɪɾɪɡːə || i'feɟi || ɪ'βɛj || ɔɾɔ  (litː 'one hand') || ɔɾɔ nɪ 'ɛndon ('one hand plus one') || ɔɾɔ nɪ 'ɪɾiɡːə  ('one hand plus two') || ɔɾɔ nɪ i'feɟi    ('one hand plus three') || ɔɾɔ nɪ ɪ'βɛj ('one hand plus four') || ʊ'sɛβɔkɔ  ('two hands' )
|-
| Bak, Jola, Jola Proper || Bandial || jɐnʊɾ || suːβɐ || si'fʰəʝi || sɪ'bɐɣɪɾ || fʊ'tɔx || fʊ'tɔx nɪ 'jɐnʊɾ  (5 + 1) || fʊ'tɔx nɪ 'suːβɐ  (5 + 2) || fʊ'tɔx nɪ si'fʰəʝi (5 + 3) || fʊ'tɔx nɪ sɪ'bɐɣɪɾ  (5 + 4) || ɣʊ'ɲɛn  (litː hands)
|-
| Bak, Jola, Jola Proper || Gusilay || janɷr ɷ = ʊ || suuβa || sifːəɟi || sɪbːaɣɪr || fɷtɔx || fɷtɔx nɪ janɷr (5 + 1) || fɷtɔx nɪ suuβa (5 + 2) || fɷtɔx nɪ sifːəɟi   (5 + 3) || fɷtɔx nɪ sɪbːaɣɪr (5 + 4) || ɡɷɲɛn  (litː hands)
|-
| Bak, Jola, Jola Proper || Jola-Fonyi (Dyola) (1) || jəkon || siɡaba || sifeeɡiir || sibaakiir || futɔk || futɔk di jəkon  (5 + 1) || futɔk di siɡaba (5 + 2) || futɔk di sifeeɡiir (5 + 3) || futɔk di sibaakiir (5 + 4) || uɲɛn
|-
| Bak, Jola, Jola Proper || Jola-Fonyi (Dyola) (2) || jəkon || siɡaba || sifeeɡiir || sibaakiir || futɔk || futɔk di jəkon  (5 + 1) || futɔk di siɡaba (5 + 2) || futɔk di sifeeɡiir (5 + 3) || futɔk di sibaakiir (5 + 4) || uɲɛn
|-
| Bak, Jola, Jola Proper || Jola-Kaasa || jɐnɔ || sil̥uβə || si'həːɟi || sɪ'bɐkɪː || hʊ'tɔk || hʊ'tɔk lɪ 'jɐnɔ  (5 + 1) || hʊ'tɔk lɪ 'sil̥uβə  (5 + 2) || hʊ'tɔk lɪ si'həːɟi  (5 + 3) || hʊ'tɔk lɪ sɪ'bɐkɪː  (5 + 4) || kʊ'ŋɛn  (litː hands)
|-
| Bak, Jola, Jola Proper || Karon || yɔːnɔːl || susupək || sihəːciːl || sɪpɐːkɪːl || ɪsɐk || ɪsɐk nɪ yɔːnɔːl    (5 + 1) || ɪsɐk nɪŋ susupək  (5 + 2) || ɪsɐk nɪŋ sihəːciːl (5 + 3) || ɪsɐk nɪŋ sɪpɐːkɪːl (5 + 4) || ŋɐːsʊwɐn susupək
|-
| Bak, Jola, Jola Proper || Kwatay (Kwaataay) || hifeeneŋ || kúsuba || kíhaaji || kibaakir || hutok || hutok ni hifeeneŋ  (5 + 1) || hutok nu kúsuba (5 + 2) || hutok ni kíhaaji  (5 + 3) || hutok ni  kibaakir (5 + 4) || sumoŋu
|-
| Bak, Manjaku-Papel || Mankanya || ulolɛ̂n || ŋɨ́tɛp || ŋɨ̀wàdʒɛ̀nt || ŋɨbakɨr || kaɲɛn || padʒɨ || nawuloŋ || bakɾɛ̂ŋ || kaɲɛ́ŋkalɔŋ || iɲɛ̂n  (litː hands)
|-
| Bak, Manjaku-Papel || Papel || o-loŋ || ŋ-puɡus || ŋ-ɟenʂ || ŋ-uakr || k-ɲene || paaɟ || ɟand || bakari || k-ɲeŋ k-loŋ  (< 10 - 1 ?) || o-diseɲene
|-
| Cangin || Laalaa (Lehar) || wi̘ːno̘ː || kɐnɐk || kɐːhɐj || niːkiːs || jə̘tu̘ːs || jitnɛːnɔː    (5 + 1) || jitnɐkɐnɐk  (5 + 2) || jitnɐkɐːhɐj  (5 + 3) || jitnɐniːkiːs (5 + 4) || dɐːŋkɛh
|-
| Cangin || Ndut || yinë [jinə] || ana [ʔana] || éeyë [ʔéeyə] || iniil [ʔiniːl] || iip [ʔiːp] || pëenë [ˈpəːnə]  (5 + 1) || paana [ˈpaːna] (5 + 2) || peeye [ˈpeːjɛ] (5 + 3) || payniil [ˈpainiːl] (5 + 4) || sabboo [ˈsabɔː]
|-
| Cangin || Noon || ˈwiːnɔ: / ˈwitnɔː  || ˈkanak || ˈkaːhaj || ˈnɪkɪːs || ˈjətu̘ːs || jɪtˈnɪːnɔː    (5 + 1) || jɪtnaˈkanak  (5 + 2) || jɪtnaˈkaːhaj (5 + 3) || jɪtnaˈnɪkɪːs (5 + 4) || ˈdaːŋkah
|-
| Cangin || Palor (Falor) || yino || ana || eye || iniil || iip || poyno  (5 + 1) || paana  (5 + 2) || peeye  (5 + 3) || payniil (5 + 4) || saɓo
|-
| Cangin || Saafi-Saafi (Safen) || ˈjiːnɔ || ˈkanak̚ || ˈkaːhay || ˈniːkis || jaːtus  (< 'hand jaːh') || ˌjiːs na ˈjiːno (5 + 1) || ˌjiːs na ˈkanak̚ (5 + 2) || ˌjiːs na ˈkaːhay (5 + 3) || ˌjiːs na ˈniːkis (5 + 4) || ˈndaŋkiaːh
|-
| Mbulungish-Nalu || Mbulungish (Baga-Foré) || kiben || ʃidi / tʃidi || ʃitɛt / tʃitɛt || ʃinɛŋ / tʃinɛŋ || susɑ || sɑkben (5 + 1) || sɑkdi (5 + 2) || sɑktɛt  (5 + 3) || sɑknɛŋ (5 + 4) || ɛtɛlɛ
|-
| Mbulungish-Nalu || Nalu (1) || deːndɪk || bilɛ || paːt || biːnaːŋ || teːduŋ || teːduŋ ti ndeːndɪk (5 + 1) || teːduŋ ti bilɛ      (5 + 2) || teːduŋ ti paːt      (5 + 3) || teːduŋ ti biːnaːŋ  (5 + 4) || tɛːblɛ ~ tɛbɪlɛ
|-
| Mbulungish-Nalu || Nalu (2) || deendek || bilɛ || paat || biinaaŋ || teedoŋ || teedoŋ ti mdeendek (5 + 1) || teedoŋ ti bilɛ (5 + 2) || teedoŋ ti paat (5 + 3) || teedoŋ ti biinaaŋ (5 + 4) || tɛɛblɛ
|-
| Limba || West-Central Limba || hantʰe || kaaye || kataati || kanaŋ || kasɔhi || kasɔŋ hantʰe (5 + 1) || kasɔŋ kaaye (5 + 2) || kasɔŋ kataati (5 + 3) || kasɔŋ kanaŋ (5 + 4) || kɔɔhi
|-
| Limba || East Limba || hantʰe || kale || katati || kanaŋ || kasɔhi || kasɔŋ hantʰe (5 + 1) || kasɔŋ kale (5 + 2) || kasɔŋ katati (5 + 3) || kasɔŋ kanaŋ (5 + 4) || kɔhi
|-
| Sua || Mansoanka (Sua) || sɔn || cen || b-rar || b-nan || sɔŋɡun || sɔŋɡun də sɔnsɔn (5 + 1) || sɔŋɡun də mcen (5 + 2) || sɔŋɡun də mbrar (5 + 3) || sɔŋɡun də mnan (5 + 4) || tɛŋi
|-
| Mel, Bullom-Kissi || Bullom So(Mani) || nìmbúl || nìncə́ŋ || nìnrá || nìŋnyɔ́l / -nyɔ́l || nìmán || mɛ̀m-búl (5 + 1) || mɛ̀ncə́ŋ (5 + 2) || mɛ̀nrá   (5 + 3) || mɛ̀nnyɔ́l  (5 + 4) || wàm
|-
| Mel, Bullom-Kissi || Sherbro || bul || tɪŋ || ræ || hyo̠l   o̠ = French au in aube' || mɛn || mɛn-buk (5 + 1) || mɛn-tɪŋ  (5 + 2) || mɛn-ra   (5 + 3) || mɛn-hyo̠l  (5 + 4) || wāŋ
|-
| Mel, Bullom-Kissi || Southern Kissi || pìlɛ̀ɛ́ || mùúŋ || ŋɡàá || hìɔ́ɔ́lú || ŋùɛ̀ɛ́nú || ŋǒmpûm   (5 + 1) || ŋǒmɛ́ú      (5 + 2) || ŋǒmáá      (5 + 3) || ŋǒmàhìɔ́ɔ́lú (5 + 4) || tɔ́
|-
| Mel, Gola || Gola || ɡuùŋ || tìyèe || taai || tiinàŋ || nɔ̀ɔ̀nɔ̀ŋ || nɔ̀ɔ̀nɔ̀ŋ diè ɡuùŋ (5 + 1) || nɔ̀ɔ̀nɔ̀ŋ leè tìyèe  (5 + 2) || nɔ̀ɔ̀nɔ̀ŋ leè taai   (5 + 3) || nɔ̀ɔ̀nɔ̀ŋ leè tiinàŋ  (5 + 4) || zììyà
|-
| Mel, Temne, Baga || Baga Mandori || piin || marəm || masaas || maaŋkəlɛɛŋ || kəcaamət || kəcaamtr tiin (5 + 1) || kəcaamtr marəm (5 + 2) || kəcaamtr masaas (5 + 3) || kəcaamtr maaŋkəlɛɛŋ (5 + 4) || ocoo
|-
| Mel, Temne, Baga || Baga Sitemu || pin || mɛrɨŋ || maːs / mãs || maŋkɨlɛ || kɨt͡ʃamɨt || t͡ʃamɨtin     (5 + 1) || t͡ʃamɨmɛrɨŋ (5 + 2) || t͡ʃamɨmaːs   (5 + 3) || t͡ʃamɨmaŋkɨlɛ (5 + 4) || wɨt͡ʃɔ
|-
| Mel, Temne, Baga || Landoma || tɛ̀n || mʌ̀rəŋ || mʌ̀sas || mànkᵊlɛ || kəcàmət || kəcʌ̀ntin (5 + 1) || kəcʌ̀ntᵊ mʌ̀rəŋ  (5 + 2) || kəcʌ̀ntᵊ̀ mʌ̀sas   (5 + 3) || kəcʌ̀ntᵊ mànkᵊlɛ (5 + 4) || pù
|-
| Mel, Temne, Temne-Banta || Temne (Themne) (1) || pín || pɨrʌ́ŋ || pɨsas || panlɛ || tamát̪ || dukín  (5 + 1) || dɛrɨ́ŋ   (5 + 2) || dɛsas   (5 + 3) || dɛŋanlɛ (5 + 4) || tɔfɔ́t
|-
| Mel, Temne, Temne-Banta || Temne (Themne) (2) || pìn || pə̀rə́ŋ || pə̀sàs || pànlɛ̀ || tàmàθ || dùkìn  (5 + 1) || dɛ̀rə̀ŋ  (5 + 2) || dɛ̀sàs   (5 + 3) || dɛ̀ŋànlɛ̀ (5 + 4) || tɔ̀fɔ̀t
|-
| Mel, Temne, Temne-Banta || Temne (Themne) (3) || p-in || pə-rəŋ || pə-sas || p-aŋlɛ || tamath || tamath rukin (5 + 1) || tamath dɛrəŋ (5 + 2) || tamath rɛsasa (5 + 3) || tamath rɛŋaŋlɛ (5 + 4) || tɔfʌt
|}

Notes

References
Citations

Bibliography

Dalby, David (1965). "The Mel languages: a reclassification of southern 'West Atlantic'." African language studies 6, 1-17.

Holst, Jan Henrik. "Reconstructing the mutation system of Atlantic." Neuried, 2008.
Pozdniakov, Konstantin. "Etudes atlantiques comparatives : questions de méthodologie." Mémoires de la Société linguistique de Paris, XV, 2007, p. 93-119.
Pozdniakov, Konstantin. "Problèmes de l’étude comparative historique des langues atlantiques". Sprache und Geschichte in Afrika, 2007.
Pozdniakov, Konstantin & Segerer, Guillame. Reconstruction des pronoms atlantiques et typologie des systèmes pronominaux // Systèmes de marques personnelles en Afrique. Collection «Afrique et Langage », 8, 2004, p. 151-162.
Pozdniakov, Konstantin & Segerer, Guillame. Tradition et rupture dans les grammaires comparées de différentes familles de langues », 2007, p. 93-119.
 Pozdniakov, Konstantin & Segerer, Guillaume (2017). "A Genealogical classification of Atlantic languages." (Draft) To appear in: Lüpke, Friederike (ed.) The Oxford guide to the Atlantic languages of West Africa: Oxford:Oxford University Press.
Guillaume Segerer & Florian Lionnet 2010. "'Isolates' in 'Atlantic'". Language Isolates in Africa workshop, Lyon, Dec. 4
Sapir, David (1971). "West Atlantic: An inventory of the languages, their noun class systems and consonant alternations." Current Trends in Linguistics 7:45-112. The Hague: Mouton.
Williamson, Kay and Blench, Roger (2000). "Niger-Congo." In Bernd Heine and Derek Nurse (eds.) African Languages: An Introduction. Cambridge: Cambridge University Press. pp. 11–42.
Wilson, W. A. A. (1989). Atlantic. In John Bendor-Samuel (Ed.), The Niger–Congo Languages.'' New York & London: University Press of America. pp. 81–104.

External links
Linguisitic and folklore material from Kujamaat Joola
UCLA page on Wolof
Journal of West African Languages: Atlantic languages
Konstantin Pozdniakov's personal site

 
Atlantic–Congo languages